Humboldt—Lake Centre was a federal electoral district in Saskatchewan, Canada, that was represented in the House of Commons of Canada
from 1979 to 1988. This riding was created in 1976 from parts of Mackenzie, Moose Jaw, Regina East, Regina—Lake Centre, Saskatoon—Biggar and Saskatoon—Humboldt ridings.

The district was abolished in 1987 when it was redistributed into the ridings of Mackenzie, Moose Jaw—Lake Centre, Regina—Qu'Appelle, Saskatoon—Dundurn and Saskatoon—Humboldt.

Members of Parliament

The following were Members of Parliament for Humboldt—Lake Centre:

 George Richardson, Progressive Conservative (1979–1980)
 Vic Althouse, New Democratic Party (1980–1988)

Election results

See also 

 List of Canadian federal electoral districts
 Past Canadian electoral districts

External links 
 

Former federal electoral districts of Saskatchewan